John Joseph "Jack" Tierney (August 3, 1893 – May 12, 1968) was an early American basketball player and coach. He was involved in the sport at all levels of his era, from high schools and college to independent leagues, as well the American Basketball League to the National Basketball League.

A native of Chicago, Illinois, Tierney stayed in the city's metropolitan area throughout his career. In 1929–30 he was a player-coach for the Chicago Majestics, an independent team. 

Some sources have Tierney playing minor league baseball, including a stint on the Bloomington Bloomers in the III League (1925).

References

1893 births
1968 deaths
American men's basketball players
Basketball coaches from Illinois
Basketball players from Chicago
Chicago American Gears coaches
Chicago Bruins coaches
Chicago Bruins players
Forwards (basketball)
High school basketball coaches in the United States
Loyola Ramblers men's basketball coaches
Player-coaches
Sportspeople from Chicago